Before the Act of Union 1707, the barons of the shire of Cromarty elected commissioners to represent them in the unicameral Parliament of Scotland and in the Convention of Estates. After 1708, Cromartyshire and Nairnshire alternated in returning one member to the House of Commons of Great Britain and later to the House of Commons of the United Kingdom.

List of shire commissioners
 1600: John Urquhart of Craigfintray
 1617–1633: Sir Thomas Urquhart of Cromarty
1639–41, 1643–44, 1644–47, 1648–51: no representation
During the Commonwealth of England, Scotland and Ireland, the sheriffdoms of Sutherland, Ross and Cromarty were jointly represented by one Member of Parliament in the Protectorate Parliament at Westminster. After the Restoration, the Parliament of Scotland was again summoned to meet in Edinburgh.
1661–1663: no representation
 1665 convention, 1667 convention, 1669–1674, 1678 convention, 1681–82, 1685–1686: George Dallas of St Martins 
 1693–1702, 1702–1707: Sir Kenneth Mackenzie of Cromarty and Grandvale
 1693: John Urquhart of Craighouse (expelled, 1700)
 1700–1701: Roderick Mackenzie of Prestonhall 
 1703–1707: Aeneas McLeod of Cadboll

References
 Margaret D. Young, The Parliaments of Scotland: Burgh and Shire Commissioners, volume 2 (Edinburgh, 1993) p. 791.

See also
 List of constituencies in the Parliament of Scotland at the time of the Union

Constituencies of the Parliament of Scotland (to 1707)
Constituencies disestablished in 1707
1707 disestablishments in Scotland